Samanta Karasiovaitė (born 17 January 1996) is a Lithuanian footballer who plays as a midfielder and has appeared for the Lithuania women's national team.

Career
Karasiovaitė has been capped for the Lithuania national team, appearing for the team during the 2019 FIFA Women's World Cup qualifying cycle.

References

External links
 
 
 

1996 births
Living people
Women's association football midfielders
Lithuanian women's footballers
Lithuania women's international footballers
Gintra Universitetas players